The BMW R nineT is a standard motorcycle made by BMW Motorrad since 2014. It is a retro styled roadster marketed by BMW to custom builders and enthusiasts as a "blank canvas for customizing".

All models have anti-lock braking systems (ABS). Automatic stability control (ASC) is available as an option.

Design elements
The BMW R nineT has several design elements configured to allow the bike to be easily modified, such as separate engine and chassis wiring harnesses and minimal bolts attaching the rear subframe, tail lights, and headlight.

The R nineT version of the bike has upside-down (USD) telescopic forks rather than BMW's usual Telelever front suspension. The other versions have conventional telescopic forks.

All variations have an air/oil-cooled oilhead flat twin (or boxer)  engine, which has the inlet manifold at the rear of the cylinders and the exhaust at the front. The oilhead is arguably more suitable for customization as it has a  more conventional appearance than the new water-cooled engine.

As of 2017 there are five R nineT variations:
R nineT - with upside-down (USD) telescopic forks
R nineT Pure - styled back roadster design
R nineT Urban G/S - similar look and style to the BMW R80G/S with a 19-inch instead of 17-inch front wheel
R nineT Racer S - a cafe racer without a passenger seat, with a nose fairing in blue, white and red trim
R nineT Sport - UK-only version with Akrapovic silencer and cafe racer styling
R nineT Scrambler - design features of the scrambler era with large 19-inch front wheel

Reception

In a The Daily Telegraph review, Roland Brown said the R nineT is "not the bike for impecunious custom builders, but a retro roadster that combines heritage, good looks, high quality finish and entertaining performance in one cleverly integrated package, with potential for easy personalisation".

A Motor Cycle News review says of the R nineT: "The build quality is superb and the attention to detail impeccable. It goes, stops and handles as well as the best roadsters out there, thanks to its modern chassis, suspension and braking components. But there’s a lovely twist with the old-school air-cooled Boxer engine".

Notes

External links

R nineT
Motorcycles powered by flat engines
Shaft drive motorcycles
Standard motorcycles